Albert F. Woller (born December 12, 1886) was a machinist, auto mechanic and Socialist politician from Milwaukee who served three terms as a member of the Wisconsin State Assembly (1923–24; 1927–1930) from the Twentieth Milwaukee County District (the 20th ward of the City of Milwaukee).

Background 
Woller was born in Germany December 12, 1886, and came to the United States with his parents in 1892. He received a public school education at Marengo, Illinois, became a machinist and eventually came to work in auto repair for the Milwaukee Western Fuel Company.

Public office 
He had been a member of the Socialist Party for fifteen years, but had never held public office before being elected to the Assembly in November, 1922, receiving 3,246 votes to 2,049 for Republican incumbent Charles Meising. He was assigned to the standing committees on transportation and third reading.

Woller did not run for office in 1924, being succeeded by fellow Socialist William Coleman. In 1926, he had moved to the 3rd Milwaukee County district (25th ward of the City) and was elected to the Assembly without opposition (one of three Socialists to run unopposed in the 1926 election). He moved to the Committee on State Affairs. He was narrowly re-elected in 1928, with 2980 votes to 2869 for Republican Arthur Bowers and 1684 for Democrat Timothy Considine.

Woller did not run for re-election in 1930; he was succeeded by fellow Socialist George Hampel.

After the legislature 
His wife, also a native of Germany, died at the age of 45 on August 27, 1931, after an illness of two years.

References 

1886 births
Machinists
Mechanics (people)
Members of the Wisconsin State Assembly
Place of death missing
Socialist Party of America politicians from Wisconsin
German emigrants to the United States
Milwaukee Common Council members
Year of death missing